Canton of Matheysine-Trièves is a canton of the Isère département, in south-eastern part of France. It was created at the French canton reorganisation which came into effect in March 2015. The seat of the canton is in La Mure. It takes its name from the regions Matheysine and Trièves.

Composition 
The canton of Matheysine-Trièves is composed of 70 communes:

Ambel
Avignonet
Beaufin
Chantepérier
Château-Bernard
Châtel-en-Trièves
Chichilianne
Cholonge
Clelles
Cognet
Cornillon-en-Trièves
Corps
Les Côtes-de-Corps
Entraigues
Gresse-en-Vercors
Laffrey
Lalley
Lavaldens
Lavars
Marcieu
Mayres-Savel
Mens
Miribel-Lanchâtre
Monestier-d'Ambel
Monestier-de-Clermont
Le Monestier-du-Percy
Monteynard
La Motte-d'Aveillans
La Motte-Saint-Martin
La Mure
Nantes-en-Ratier
Notre-Dame-de-Vaulx
Oris-en-Rattier
Pellafol
Percy
Pierre-Châtel
Ponsonnas
Prébois
Prunières
Quet-en-Beaumont
Roissard
Saint-Andéol
Saint-Arey
Saint-Baudille-et-Pipet
Sainte-Luce
Saint-Guillaume
Saint-Honoré
Saint-Jean-de-Vaulx
Saint-Jean-d'Hérans
Saint-Laurent-en-Beaumont
Saint-Martin-de-Clelles
Saint-Martin-de-la-Cluze
Saint-Maurice-en-Trièves
Saint-Michel-en-Beaumont
Saint-Michel-les-Portes
Saint-Paul-lès-Monestier
Saint-Pierre-de-Méaroz
Saint-Théoffrey
La Salette-Fallavaux
La Salle-en-Beaumont
Siévoz
Sinard
Sousville
Susville
Treffort
Tréminis
Valbonnais
La Valette
Valjouffrey
Villard-Saint-Christophe

References

Cantons of Isère